Kaikudunna Nilavu is a 1998 Indian Malayalam film,  directed by Kamal and written by Ranjith (director). The film stars Jayaram, Dileep, Ranjitha,  and Shalini in the lead roles. The film has songs by Kaithapram. The background score was by Johnson. The film was dubbed in Tamil as Nilave Unakkaga. The film was an average run at the box office.

Cast
Jayaram as Mahendran
Dileep as Kichamani
Ranjitha as Bhama
Shalini as Veni
Bharath Gopi as Veni's Grandfather
Unnikrishnan Namboothiri as Muthassan
Kalabhavan Mani as Lakshmanan
Augustine as Constable
Nandhu as Kichamani's friend
P Sukumar  as Subhramaniyan
Murali as Ravuthar, Police Officer
T. P. Madhavan as Bhama's father

Soundtrack

References

External links
 

1998 films
1990s Malayalam-language films
Films directed by Kamal (director)
Films with screenplays by Ranjith